Love Premiere is a 1943 German comedy film directed by Arthur Maria Rabenalt and starring Hans Söhnker, Kirsten Heiberg and Fritz Odemar. The film's sets were designed by Robert Herlth.

The film based on the stage play "Axel an der Himmelstür", that was a great success for Zarah Leander and established her marvelous career in 1936. When Zarah Leander signed a film contract with UFA in Babelsberg in 1937, Kirsten Heiberg was invited to replace Leander on stage but refused to. In 1943 originally Zarah Leander was the first choice to recreate her role on the silver screen but she left Germany in the midst of 1943 to return to her native Sweden. Thus Kirsten Heiberg could return to the screen after a film interdiction of two years. Her husband Franz Grothe wrote all new songs for her and the film was a huge success. It is totally non-political and still one of the best German efforts to find its own kind of sophisticated comedy.

Cast

References

External links

Films of Nazi Germany
German comedy-drama films
1943 comedy-drama films
Films directed by Arthur Maria Rabenalt
German black-and-white films
Terra Film films
1940s German films